The Little Door Into the World is a 1923 British silent drama film directed by George Dewhurst and starring Lawford Davidson, Nancy Beard and Olaf Hytten.

Cast
 Lawford Davidson as Lefarge  
 Nancy Beard as Maria Jose / Celestine  
 Olaf Hytten as Mountebank  
 Peggy Patterson as Dancer  
 Victor Tandy as Agent  
 Arthur Mayhew as Troubador  
 Bob Williamson as Manager

References

Bibliography
 Ann C. Paietta. Saints, Clergy and Other Religious Figures on Film and Television, 1895–2003. McFarland, 2005.

External links
 

1923 films
1923 drama films
British drama films
British silent feature films
Films directed by George Dewhurst
British black-and-white films
1920s English-language films
1920s British films
Silent drama films